Ulrik Rosenløv Laursen (born 28 February 1976) is a Danish former professional footballer who played as a defender. Laursen was predominantly used in the centre, but was also competent as a left back.

Career
Laursen began his career at Odense Boldklub, where his talent was quickly discovered. He debuted for the Danish under-19 national team in 1993, aged 17, and won the 1993 Danish under-19 Player of the Year award. He transferred to Hibernian under manager Alex McLeish, on a free transfer in 2000. He was a fans favourite at Easter Road, scoring five goals in 82 appearances and helped the club reach the 2001 Scottish Cup Final against Celtic, which they lost 3–0.

He signed for Celtic in a £1.3 million deal in August 2002, and his first season saw him enjoy an extended run in the first team, thanks to injuries to other players. He made more than 30 appearances for "the Hoops" during the 2002–03 season, including the 2003 UEFA Cup Final against FC Porto. However, he failed to make any appearances the following season aside from one substitute appearance in the League Cup. He saw more playing time during the 2004–05 season, but he moved back to OB in the summer of 2005.

Laursen then transferred to F.C. Copenhagen in January 2008. After only six months in Copenhagen, Laursen was selected as new captain after Michael Gravgaard's departure to FC Nantes.

On 11 May 2010, Laursen confirmed that he will retire at the end of the 2009–10 season.

Honours

OB
Danish 1st Division: 1998–99
Danish Cup: 2006–07

Celtic
Scottish Premier League: 2003–04
Scottish Cup: 2003–04, 2004–05
UEFA Cup runners up: 2002–03

Copenhagen
Danish Superliga: 2008–09 & 2009–10
Danish Cup: 2008–09

References

External links

 F.C. Copenhagen profile
 Danish national team profile

1976 births
Living people
Footballers from Odense
Danish men's footballers
Denmark international footballers
Denmark under-21 international footballers
Odense Boldklub players
Hibernian F.C. players
Celtic F.C. players
F.C. Copenhagen players
Danish Superliga players
Scottish Premier League players
Danish expatriate men's footballers
Expatriate footballers in Scotland
Association football defenders
Danish expatriate sportspeople in Scotland